Outside the Gate is the seventh studio album by English post-punk band Killing Joke, released in June 1988 by E.G. via Virgin Records worldwide. It was a significant stylistic departure for the band, with complex synthesised (orchestra influenced) arrangements and less prominent guitar. Tensions within the band surfaced during pre-production. Drummer Paul Ferguson was dismissed at the beginning of the sessions and replaced by a studio musician while bassist Paul Raven took part to the recording but ultimately asked his name to be withdrawn from the credits for major disagreement over artistic content. The lead single was "America".

Production, sleeve, promotion and aftermath 
In 1987, the band recorded new material written and produced by singer Jaz Coleman and guitarist Geordie Walker. The tempos and time signatures of the music were determined using gematria. It also featured prominent synthesised instrumentation from Coleman, who was keen to use the symphonic techniques he had learned in his recent classical composition training. Paul Ferguson initially attempted to record drums but, according to Coleman, was ejected because he was unable to perform the complex material to the required standard. This version of events was later rejected by Paul Raven, who stated: "I know Paul and when he does something he does it properly. If it wasn't right he would have stayed there 'til it was". Session player Jimmy Copley was brought in to re-record the drums with Jeff Scantlebury for additional percussion. Raven departed shortly afterwards and asked for his name to be removed from the album credits, purportedly calling Coleman and Walker "a pair of ego-strokers". Multiple overdubs were undertaken after the departure of Ferguson and Raven. 

A picture collage of Coleman and Walker appears on the album sleeve and the pair promoted the album with no other band members. In an interview for MTV in the UK, in May 1988, the pair stated their intention to support Outside the Gate with a tour. Coleman also stated of the album's new style that they "wanted a more articulate funky powerful rhythm" and that "as long as [he is] alive and as long as Geordie is alive, Killing Joke is alive."

Ferguson has retrospectively suggested Outside the Gate began as a solo project by Coleman. In an interview given in 2016, he stated that costs mounted during production, leading to the record label insisting that the project become a Killing Joke album, though he and Raven did not participate in the writing.

Release 

Outside the Gate was not released until 27 June 1988 and entered the UK Albums Chart at number 92, staying for just one week. It was panned by critics. Sounds said of the album: "It's a stodgy, inconclusive LP that fails in all but the most basic of senses to achieve its end, leaving us feeling soured and unimpressed". NME shared the same point of view and depicted it as "a private breakfast of ideas, depicting poor old Jaz wading through quicksand with his jeans rolled down yet again. Worse ... he seems to be wandering off in exactly the same direction". Retrospective reviews have remained largely negative; David Jeffries of AllMusic said that "pallid synths poorly imitate orchestras, the complex song structures are just tedious, Coleman acts as if he's Freddie Mercury and David Bowie mashed together, and none of the throb, thunder or heavy riffage so important to the Killing Joke name is to be found." Adrien Begrand of PopMatters called it simply "disastrous".

The album was not promoted with any gigs and was not even released in the USA. Two singles, "America" and "My Love of This Land", were released but did little to improve its fortunes. The video for the former song featured Coleman and Walker along with drummer Copley and session bassist Jerome Rimson, who did not actually record or play live with the band.

Due to poor sales, Virgin dropped the group two months after the release of the album. In 2008, the album was re-released with bonus tracks, including rough mixes of some songs. The previously unreleased track "May Day" was re-written as part of "Tiahuanaco". The original release was dedicated to Conny Plank, who had produced several Killing Joke records, after his death in 1987. The 2008 reissue was dedicated to Raven, following his death the previous year.

Track listing

Personnel 

 Killing Joke
 Jaz Coleman – vocals, keyboards, piano, production
 Kevin "Geordie" Walker – guitar, bass guitar, production
 Paul Raven – bass guitar (uncredited)

 Additional personnel
 Jimmy Copley – drums
 Jeff Scantlebury – percussion

 Technical
 Martin Rex - recording engineer
 Glenn Skinner - mixing
 Bill Smith Studio - sleeve design
 Fil Le Gonidec - crew

Charts

References

External links 

 Raven's version of events from this period 
 

1988 albums
Killing Joke albums
E.G. Records albums
Synth-pop albums by English artists